Tillandsia delicata is a species of flowering plant in the genus Tillandsia. This species is endemic to Mexico.

References

delicata
Flora of Mexico